Central arteries may refer to:

 Anterolateral central arteries
 Central artery of retina
 Paramedian arteries, also known as posteromedial central arteries